The International Forum of Independent Audit Regulators (IFIAR) is a global member organization comprising independent audit regulators from 54 jurisdictions. 

IFIAR was established in Paris in 2006. Its members are audit regulators and supervisors from the continents of Africa, Asia, Europe, North and South America and Oceania.

Activities 
IFIAR holds a Plenary meeting annually to discuss broad issues related to audit quality matters.

There are five formal Working Groups that meet regularly throughout the year and submit their deliverables to the Plenary meeting:

 Enforcement Working Group: chaired by Elizabeth Barrett, FRC, United Kingdom
 Global Audit Quality Working Group: chaired by William Di Cicco, H3C, France
 Investor and Other Stakeholder Working Group: chaired by Peter Hofbauer, APAB, Austria
 Inspection Workshops Working Group: chaired by Askin Akbulut, AOB, Germany
 Standards Coordination Working Group: chaired by Martijn Duffels, AFM, The Netherlands

Inspection Findings Survey 
Since 2012, IFIAR conducts Annual Inspection Findings Survey and publishes its report.
These reports show general trends of audit inspection findings.

Membership 
As of April 2022, IFIAR had 54 members. IFIAR members are divided into two categories:
 Members
 Associate members
As of April 2022, all IFIAR members are ordinary members and have voting rights.

Multilateral Memorandum of Understanding 

IFIAR Members approved the MMOU concerning co-operation in the exchange of information for audit oversight on June 30, 2015. Currently, 22 members signed the MMOU.

IFIAR Board 
The IFIAR Board was established in April 2017. Current Board Members are Australia, Brazil, Canada, Chinese Taipei, France, Germany, Greece, Ireland, Japan, the Netherlands, Singapore,  South Africa, Switzerland,Turkey, the United Kingdom and the United States.

References

External links
IFIAR website

Auditing organizations
Organizations established in 2006
International standards organizations